Pope John II (died 8 May 535), born Mercurius, was the bishop of Rome from 2 January 533 to his death. As a priest at St. Clement's Basilica, he endowed that church with gifts and commissioned stone carvings for it. Mercurius became the first pope to adopt a new Papal name upon his elevation to the office. During his pontificate, John II notably removed Bishop Contumeliosus of Riez from his office, convened a council on the readmission of Arian clergy, and approved an edict of emperor Justinian, promulgating doctrine opposed by his predecessor, Pope Hormisdas.

Early life 

Mercurius was born in Rome, son of Praeiectus. He became a priest at St. Clement's Basilica on the Caelian Hill, and even before becoming pope he had commissioned work for the basilica and made generous donations. The basilica still retains memorials of "Johannes surnamed Mercurius"; he donated plutei and transennae. A reference to "Presbyter Mercurius" is found on a fragment of an ancient ciborium. Several marble slabs that enclose the schola cantorum bear upon them, in the style of the sixth century, his monogram.

Pontificate
Mercurius was elected pope on 2 January 533, apparently the first pope to adopt a new name upon elevation to the papacy.

The notoriously adulterous behavior of Bishop Contumeliosus of Riez caused John to order the bishops of Gaul to confine him in a monastery. Until a new bishop could be appointed, he bade the clergy of Riez to obey the Bishop of Arles.

Stemming from pope Hormisdas' suppression of the statement "one of the Trinity suffered in the flesh" in Scythian monastic liturgies, the Acoemetae, or Sleepless Monks, began to support Nestorianism, the belief that Jesus is neither human nor divine. Emperor Justinian I and patriarch Epiphanius of Constantinople opposed this ideology and sent a deputation to Rome which prompted John II to assemble a synod, excommunicate the Acoemetae, and to issue statements approving the doctrine of the emperor.

Arianism 
In 535, 217 bishops assembled in a council at Carthage submitted to John II a decision about whether bishops who had lapsed into Arianism should, on repentance, keep their rank or be admitted only to lay communion. The question of re-admittance to the lapsed troubled north Africa for centuries (see Novatianism and Donatism). The answer to their question was given by Agapetus I, as John II died on 8 May 535. He was buried in St Peter's Basilica.

See also
 List of Catholic saints
 List of popes

References

470 births
535 deaths
Burials at St. Peter's Basilica
Date of birth unknown
Italian popes
Ostrogothic Papacy
Popes
6th-century popes